Marco Antonio Bragadin, also Marcantonio Bragadin (21 April 1523 – 17 August 1571), was a Venetian lawyer and military officer of the Republic of Venice.

Bragadin joined the Fanti da Mar Corps or marines of the Republic of Venice. In 1569, he was appointed Captain-General of Famagusta in Cyprus and led the Venetian resistance to the Ottoman–Venetian War (1570–1573). He was executed by flaying in August 1571 in contravention of negotiated safe passage after the Ottoman Empire took Famagusta, the fall of which signalled the end of Western presence in the Mediterranean island for the next three centuries.

Early life
He was born in Venice. After a short stint as lawyer in 1543, Bragadin pursued a career in the navy, being entrusted with several posts on the Venetian galleys.

Once back in Venice, Bragadin was pressed into the city's magistrates; in 1560 and later in 1566 he was made a galley governor, without, though, having occasion to actually assume command of a ship.

Captain of the Kingdom of Cyprus
In 1569 he was elected as Captain of the Kingdom of Cyprus and moved to Famagusta, then a rich port, where he assumed civil governorship over the whole island, well aware that a decisive clash with the Ottoman fleet was imminent.

Bragadin worked hard to fortify Famagusta thoroughly; the introduction of gunpowder meant that scientifically-planned fortifications with solid walls were needed. So the harbour was endowed with strong defenses, such as the Martinengo bastion, an excellent example of modern fortification granting easy defense on both sides of its walls.

The Turks landed at Cyprus on July 3, 1570. Nicosia fell after a two months' siege. The severed head of the locumtenens regni ("viceroy"), Niccolò Dandolo, was sent to Bragadin, who, undaunted, prepared for the enemy assault.

The Siege of Famagusta
Famagusta came under siege on September 17, 1570.

Marcantonio Bragadin led the defence of Famagusta with Lorenzo Tiepolo, Captain of Paphos, and general Astorre Baglioni.

The Ottoman forces kept pressure on Famagusta for months, while artillery relentlessly pounded the city's bulwarks. According to Venetian chroniclers (whose numbers are treated with some skepticism by modern scholarship), about 6,000 garrison troops stood against some 100,000 Turks with 1,500 cannons, backed by about 150 ships enforcing a naval blockade to stave off reinforcements and resupply efforts.

The besieged garrison of Famagusta put up a heroic struggle lasting well beyond the most optimistic assumptions, against far superior enemy numbers and without any hope of help from the motherland. Furthermore, the Turks were employing new tactics. The entire belt of walls surrounding the town and the exterior plain was filled with earth up to the top of the fortifications. In the meantime a number of tunnels were dug out towards and under the city walls to undermine and breach them.

In July, 1571 the Turks eventually breached the fortifications and their forces broke into the citadel, being repulsed only at the cost of heavy losses. With provisions and ammunition running out, and no sign of relief from Venice on August 1, Bragadin asked for terms of surrender.

Death and legacy

Famagusta's defenders made terms with the Ottomans before the city was taken by force, since the traditional laws of war allowed for negotiation before the city's defenses were successfully breached, whereas after a city fell by storm all lives and property in the city would be forfeit. The Ottoman commander agreed that, in return for the city's surrender, all Westerners in the city could exit under their own flag and be guaranteed safe passage to Venice-held Crete; Greeks could leave immediately, or wait two years to decide whether to remain in Famagusta under Ottoman rule, or depart the city for any destination of their choice. For the next four days, evacuation proceeded smoothly. Then, at the surrender ceremony on August 5 where Bragadin offered the vacated city to Mustafa, the Ottoman general accused him of murdering Turkish prisoners and hiding munitions. According to Barnaby Rogerson in the Empire podcast, hosted by William Dalrymple and Anita Anand, Bragadin was asked what happened to captured Hajj pilgrims so that they may be traded for the prisoners and he mockingly told the Ottomans they were killed. Suddenly, Mustafa pulled a knife and cut off Bragadin's right ear, then ordered his guards to cut off the other ear and his nose.

There followed a massacre of all Christians still in the city, with Bragadin himself most brutally abused. After being left in prison for two weeks, his earlier wounds festering, he was dragged round the walls with "sacks of earth and stone" on his back; next, he was tied to a chair and hoisted to the yardarm of the Turkish flagship, where he was exposed to the taunts of the sailors. Finally, he was taken to his place of execution in the main square, tied naked to a column, and flayed alive. Bragadin's quartered body was then distributed as a war trophy among the army, and his skin was stuffed with straw and sewn, reinvested with his military insignia, and exhibited riding an ox in a mocking procession along the streets of Famagusta. 

Bragadin's skin was later stolen from Constantinople's arsenal in 1580 by the young Venetian seaman Girolamo Polidori. He brought it back to Venice, where it was received as a returning hero. The skin was preserved first in the church of San Gregorio, then interred with full honors in the Basilica di San Giovanni e Paolo, where it still is.

Bragadin's fame rests upon the incredible resistance that he made against the vastly superior besieging forces. From a military point of view, the besieged garrison's perseverance required a massive effort by the Ottoman Turks, who were so heavily committed that they were unable to redeploy in time when the Holy League built up the fleet that was later victorious against the Muslim power at Lepanto. Historians to this day debate just why Venice did not send help to Bragadin from Souda, Crete. It is alleged that some Venetians thought about putting their limited military assets to better use in the forthcoming clash, already in sight, which would climax in the Battle of Lepanto.

References

Bibliography
 Bicheno, Hugh. Crescent and Cross: The Battle of Lepanto 1571. Phoenix, London, 2003.  
 Crowley, Roger. "Empires of the Sea: The Siege of Malta, the Battle of Lepanto, and the Contest for the center of the World." Random House: New York, NY. 2008.  
 Foglietta, U. The Sieges of Nicosia and Famagusta. London: Waterlow, 1903.
 Hopkins, T. C. F., "Confrontation at Lepanto – Christendom vs. Islam"
 
 Monello, G. "Accadde a Famagosta, l'assedio turco ad una fortezza veneziana ed il suo sconvolgente finale", Cagliari, Scepsi e Mattana, 2006.
 

1523 births
1571 deaths
Republic of Venice military personnel
16th-century Italian military personnel
People executed by flaying
16th-century executions by the Ottoman Empire
Executed Italian people
Republic of Venice people of the Ottoman–Venetian Wars
Venetian Cyprus
Burials at Santi Giovanni e Paolo, Venice
Bragadin family